The bacterial outer membrane is found in gram-negative bacteria. Its composition is distinct from that of the inner cytoplasmic cell membrane - among other things, the outer leaflet of the outer membrane of many gram-negative bacteria includes a complex lipopolysaccharide whose lipid portion acts as an endotoxin - and in some bacteria such as E. coli it is linked to the cell's peptidoglycan by Braun's lipoprotein.

Porins can be found in this layer.

Clinical significance
If lipid A, part of the lipopolysaccharide, enters the circulatory system it causes a toxic reaction by activating toll like receptor TLR 4. Lipid A is very pathogenic and not immunogenic. However, the polysaccharide component is very immunogenic, but not pathogenic, causing an aggressive response by the immune system. The sufferer will have a high temperature and respiration rate and a low blood pressure.  This may lead to endotoxic shock, which may be fatal. The bacterial outer membrane is physiologically shed as the bounding membrane of outer membrane vesicles in cultures, as well as in animal tissues at the host-pathogen interface, implicated in translocation of gram-negative microbial biochemical signals to host or target cells.

Biogenesis
The biogenesis of the outer membrane requires that the individual components are transported from the site of synthesis to their final destination outside the inner membrane by crossing both hydrophilic and hydrophobic compartments. The machinery and the energy source that drive this process are not yet fully understood. The lipid A-core moiety and the O-antigen repeat units are synthesized at the cytoplasmic face of the inner membrane and are separately exported via two independent transport systems, namely, the O-antigen transporter Wzx (RfbX) and the ATP binding cassette (ABC) transporter MsbA that flips the lipid A-core moiety from the inner leaflet to the outer leaflet of the inner membrane. O-antigen repeat units are then polymerised in the periplasm by the Wzy polymerase and ligated to the lipid A-core moiety by the WaaL ligase.

The LPS transport machinery is composed of LptA, LptB, LptC, LptD, LptE. This supported by the fact that depletion of any one of these proteins blocks the LPS assembly pathway and results in very similar outer membrane biogenesis defects. Moreover, the location of at least one of these five proteins in every cellular compartment suggests a model for how the LPS assembly pathway is organised and ordered in space.

LptC is required for the translocation of lipopolysaccharide (LPS) from the inner membrane to the outer membrane. LptE forms a complex with LptD, which is involved in the assembly of LPS in the outer leaflet of the outer membrane and is essential for envelope biogenesis.

See also
 Outer mitochondrial membrane
 Host-pathogen interface

References

Protein families
Membrane biology